Boston Common Tablet is a 1913 sculpture by R. Clipston Sturgis, installed at Boston Common in Boston, Massachusetts, United States.

Description and history
The slate and granite tablet is installed near the intersection of Park and Tremont streets, and measures approximately 15 x 5 x 20 ft. An inscription reads:

.

The artwork was surveyed as part of the Smithsonian Institution's "Save Outdoor Sculpture!" program in 1997.

See also

 1913 in art

References

External links
 

1913 establishments in Massachusetts
1913 sculptures
Boston Common
Buildings and structures completed in 1913
Granite sculptures in Massachusetts
Monuments and memorials in Boston
Outdoor sculptures in Boston
Stone sculptures in Massachusetts